Phytoscutus is a genus of mites in the family Phytoseiidae.

Species
The genus Phytoscutus contains the following species:
 Phytoscutus acaridophagus (Collyer, 1964)
 Phytoscutus bakeri (Gupta, 1980)
 Phytoscutus eugenus (Ueckermann & Loots, 1985)
 Phytoscutus glomus (Pritchard & Baker, 1962)
 Phytoscutus gongylus (Pritchard & Baker, 1962)
 Phytoscutus reunionensis (Ueckermann & Loots, 1985)
 Phytoscutus salebrosus (Chant, 1960)
 Phytoscutus sexpilis Muma, 1961
 Phytoscutus vaughni (Chant & Baker, 1965)
 Phytoscutus wiesei (Ueckermann & Loots, 1985)
 Phytoscutus wongsirii (Ehara & Bhandhufalck, 1977)

References

Phytoseiidae